The Battle of Culiacán also known colloquially as Culiacanazo and Black Thursday was a failed operation by the Mexican National Guard to capture Ovidio Guzmán López (son of Sinaloa Cartel kingpin Joaquín "El Chapo" Guzmán), who is wanted in the United States for drug trafficking.

Events
On 17 October 2019, a large convoy of vehicles drove up to Guzmán López's house in Culiacán, Sinaloa, based on an extradition warrant from a US judge, then came under fire. The military succeeded in capturing Guzmán López, but quickly found themselves surrounded by cartel enforcers. 

Around 700 cartel gunmen began to attack civilian, government and military targets around the city, and massive towers of smoke could be seen rising from burning cars and vehicles. The cartels were well-equipped, with armored vehicles, bulletproof vests, .50 caliber rifles, rocket launchers, grenade launchers and heavy machine guns. In the end, Guzmán López was released after the cartel took multiple hostages, including eight servicemen and the housing unit where the military's families lived in Culiacán.

President Andrés Manuel López Obrador defended the decision to release Guzmán López, arguing it prevented further loss of life, insisting that he wanted to pacify the country and did not want more massacres, and arguing that the capture of one drug smuggler could not be more valuable than the lives of innocent civilians. While admitting that the security forces underestimated the Cartel's manpower and ability to respond, López Obrador also clarified that the criminal process against Guzmán López was still ongoing, sending 8000 troops and police reinforcements to restore peace in Culiacan.

Following another operation in Culiacán on 5 January 2023, Guzmán López was successfully recaptured by Mexican authorities and transferred to the Altiplano maximum security federal prison in Almoloya de Juárez.

References

Battle of
Battles in 2019
Battles of the Mexican drug war
October 2019 events in Mexico
Operations against organized crime in Mexico
Organized crime conflicts in Mexico
Sinaloa Cartel
Violent non-state actor incidents in Mexico